Lawrence Kelly "Bee" Lawler (December 8, 1891 – June 10, 1973) was an American football, basketball and baseball player and coach. He played college football at the University of Minnesota in Minneapolis from 1911 to 1913, where he was also a baseball and basketball player.

Lawler was named captain of the Minnesota Golden Gophers men's basketball team in 1915. He later served as the head football coach at University of St. Thomas in Saint Paul, Minnesota in 1919 and as the head baseball coach at Minnesota in 1922.

References

External links

1891 births
1973 deaths
Fargo-Moorhead Graingrowers players
Minnesota Golden Gophers baseball coaches
Minnesota Golden Gophers baseball players
Minnesota Golden Gophers football players
Minnesota Golden Gophers men's basketball players
Superior Red Sox players
Winnipeg Maroons (baseball) players
People from Minneapolis
Players of American football from Minnesota
American men's basketball players